Mr Gay World is a registered and trademarked annual international competition for gay men.

The reigning Mr Gay World is José López Duvont from Puerto Rico. López is the first Latino winner, and the first winner from the Americas.

Beginnings
Before there was Mr Gay World, there was IMG Mr Gay International. Brian Merriman (owner of Mr Gay Ireland) and Tore Aasheim (co-owner of Mr Gay Europe) attended the competition with the European delegation. Merriman and Aasheim decided to create their own international competition.

Brian Merriman invited Tore Aasheim, Morten Ruda (owner of Mr Gay Norway and co-owner of Mr Gay Europe) and Dean Nelson (owner of Mr Gay Canada) to Dublin, Ireland to plan a brand new international competition. They invited Eric Butter (who is the current President and co-founder of Mr Gay World and Noemi Alberto (owner of Mr Gay Philippines) to what was to become Mr Gay World.

Merriman and Ruda bowed out due to other commitments, and the ownership was divided equally between Aasheim, Nelson and Butter. Both Merriman and Ruda stayed involved in the competition as Directors responsible for finding delegates in Europe and Africa to attend the competitions.

After a while Nelson left the competition and left his shares of Mr Gay World to Eric Butter, and later Eric Butter and Tore Aasheim exchanged their shares in Mr Gay Europe and Mr Gay World respectively, making Eric Butter the President and co-founder of Mr Gay World and Tore Aasheim the sole owner of Mr Gay Europe.

Media Coverage 
The event explicitly seeks to highlight discrimination against LGBTI people and provide select positive role models. A number of contestants from a number of countries has faced sanctions for their selection or competition, including Nolan Lewis from India, Taurai Zhanje from Zimbabwe, Robel Hailu from Ethiopia, former Olympian Chavdar Arsov from Bulgaria, Wendelinus Hamutenya from Namibia and Xiao Dai from China.

Mr Gay World is defined as an annual contest for gay men, seeking to establish ambassadors for LGBTQIA+ and human rights, with winners of national contests competing as delegates in a variety of categories. Mr Gay World not a beauty contest and there is no age limit. In an all-inclusive move, Mr Gay World has amended its policy to encompass the male-identifying spectrum within the LGBTQ+ community,” said the organisation in a statement on Tuesday, June 15, 2021*.

Controversy 
In 2014, Mr Gay New Zealand, Mr Gay Australia and a sponsoring skincare company all pulled out of the competition claiming 'bullying, poor living conditions, and inappropriate pressure to hook up with other contestants'. Mr Gay World replied claiming that the two contestants had been removed for alcohol abuse and rule breaking.

In 2015, the winner of the competition, Mr Gay Germany Klaus Burkart, stepped down seven months later citing “personal changes,” and was replaced by Mr Gay Hong Kong.

In 2018, Mr Gay World announced that the 2019 competition will move to South Africa from Hong Kong due to prohibition from local authorities.

In November 2021, Mr. Gay World South Africa 2021 Louw Breytenbach resigned; the title was given to South African Runner-up Bonginkosi Ndima, who then resigned in March 2022, and then Mr. Gay World Philippines 2021 Joel Rey Carcasona took over the title Mr. Gay World 2021.

Titleholders

Country/Territory by number of wins

Runner-Up

See also
 International Mr Gay Competition

References

External links
 Official event website
 
 
 

 
Recurring events established in 2009
LGBT beauty pageants
Gay events
Transgender beauty pageants
Annual events